The list of ship launches in 1755 includes a chronological list of some ships launched in 1755.


References

1755
Ship launches